Sarah May Yee Ho (born 28 October 1978) is an Australian soccer referee. She has been an assistant referee in both the W-League and the A-League competitions.

Ho officiated at the 2004 FIFA U-19 Women's World Championship, 2006 FIFA U-20 Women's World Championship and the 2007 FIFA Women's World Cup and was one of the assistant referees for the 2011 FIFA Women's World Cup opening game.

She was appointed as an assistant referee for the 2015 FIFA Women's World Cup. She also teaches at Blacktown Girls High School.

References 

Living people
1978 births
Australian soccer referees
Women association football referees
FIFA Women's World Cup referees
A-League Men referees
A-League Women referees